Jayya, Jia or Jeya is a Khokaran village of the Mandi Bahauddin District in the Punjab province of Pakistan. It has the postal code 50471. Its 15 km away from Mandi Bahauddin and some 3 km southeast of Chhimmon.

Jayya can be reached by the Sargodha Road and then following the Chimon Sahna Road from King Road. After getting close to the village, there are two access roads to it. One diverts from Rohi Wala stop while the other from Dera Fateh Muhammad. The former enters from the east of the village while the later from the west.

It has an area of around 6.5 Sq km. Main economy of the village is dependent upon agriculture and related services. The secondary economical source of this village is services of its residents in different national and international areas.

The main crops cultivated in the village are sugar cane, rice and wheat. The cattle forming can be seen all around in the village.

The literacy rate of the village is not very good and comparatively less than the country's literacy rate. It has one elementary school for boys and a primary school for girls. It has also two private secondary schools

This village has two "headmen"(Muhammed Hayat and Muhammad Amin) who are representatives of Provincial Revenue Department in the village. Both headmen are residing on the eastern access road of the village.

It has a rich source of renewable energy in terms of biogas and solar energy. Some of the projects on self-financing have been started by few of its residents.

References

Villages in Mandi Bahauddin District